Threlkeld railway station was situated on the Cockermouth, Keswick and Penrith Railway between Penrith and Cockermouth in Cumbria, England. The station served the village of Threlkeld. The station opened to passenger traffic on 2 January 1865, and closed on 6 March 1972.

References

 
 
 
 

Disused railway stations in Cumbria
Former Cockermouth, Keswick and Penrith Railway stations
Railway stations in Great Britain opened in 1865
Railway stations in Great Britain closed in 1972
Beeching closures in England